Felicia deserti is a species of plant from South Africa. It belongs to the daisy family.

Description 
The oblancelate leaves are alternately arranged and covered in thick hair. Solitary radiate flowerheads are borne on hairy stems and surrounded by three or four overlapping rows of bracts. The ray (external) florets are blue, and the disc (central) florets are yellow. Flowers are present in September. The cypselas (seeds with a fluffy tuft growing out the top) have short hairs.

Distribution 
This species has been found growing in South Africa. Its distribution ranges from Uppington to Namaqualand.

References 

Flora of South Africa
Plants described in 1973
deserti